Deuterotinea palaestinensis is a moth in the Eriocottidae family. It was described by Rebel in 1901. It is found in Israel and Turkey.

The wingspan is 27–32 mm. The forewings are light brown with whitish veins and a broad dark brown band along the margins. The hindwings are pale brownish-grey.

References

Moths described in 1901
Eriocottidae
Lepidoptera of Israel
Moths of Asia